This is a list of notable alumni and faculty associated with Mapúa University (formerly the Mapúa Institute of Technology) located in Intramuros, Manila and Makati in the Philippines.

Academe
Creselda Magboo-Roldan, BSArch & MSArch - Dean, School of Engineering, Architecture & Fine Arts, Divine Word College of Calapan
Peter Ureta, BSCE - Dean of the College of Engineering at FEU Institute of Technology
Ernesto Endrina, BSArchi - Dean of the College of Architecture at the University of Northern Philippines
Edwin Obra, BSChE - Dean of the College of Engineering at the Emilio Aguinaldo College
Antonio Mateo, BSEE - Dean of the College of Engineering at Adamson University
Melencio Gener, BSME - Dean of the College of Engineering, Architecture and Technology at Palawan State University
Arturo Trinidad, BSBA - Dean of the University of the East Graduate School of Business Administration
Jose Mananzan, BSBA - former Dean of the Asian Institute of Tourism at the University of the Philippines
Herman Gamboa, BSEE - founder of STI Education Services Group
Demetrio Quirino, HS - Founder of the Technological Institute of the Philippines (TIP)
Alfredo Ang, BSCE - Professor Emeritus of Civil Engineering; University of Illinois at Urbana-Champaign and University of California at Irvine
Ricardo Aranas, BSAR - professor at the School of Housing, Building and Planning of the Universiti Sains Malaysia
Ronnie Catipon, BSEE - professor at the School of Business at Franklin University
Leon Chua, BSEE - professor at the University of California at Berkeley
Nicanor Dela Rama, BSME - Dean of the College of Engineering at the Bulacan State University
Wilfredo Jose, BSChE - professor at the University of the Philippines and Most Outstanding Chemical Engineer of the Year awardee
Lee Seng Lip, BSCE - Professor and Head of the Department of Civil Engineering, National University of Singapore (NUS)
Orestes Mapua, BSAR - professor at the School of Housing, Building and Planning of the Universiti Sains Malaysia
Ricardo Pama, BSCE - former Vice President of the Asian Institute of Technology (AIT) in Bangkok, Thailand and now President of the University of the Cordilleras
Francis Yu, BSEE - Professor Emeritus of Electrical Engineering, Pennsylvania State University, University of Michigan, and Wayne State University
Arthur A. De Guia, PhD, BSEE - Professor, University of California - Berkeley
Guillermo Capati, BSCE/ BSSE, Adjunct Professor at the University of Queensland, Advance Water Management Centre

Architecture
Gerardo Magat - architect and educator; garnered the highest score in the history of Philippine architecture board examination, 98%
Pablo Antonio - National Artist for Architecture
Lor Calma - architect and builder
Cesar Concio - architect and educator; Gold Medal of Merit awardee from the Philippine Institute of Architects PIA and 1969 Patnubay ng Sining at Kalinangan awardee; former Dean Emeritus of the Mapua Institute of Technology
William Coscolluela (1997) - architect and recipient of the Gold Medal of Merit award from the Philippine Institute of Architects PIA; awarded BCI Asia Top Ten Architects in the Philippines; founder of W.V. Coscolluela and Associates; projects include RCBC Plaza, Zuellig Building, Philam Life Tower, Robinsons Galleria, SM City North EDSA, and Discovery Shores Boracay
Paulino Lim (1998) - architect and recipient of the Gold Medal of Merit award from the Philippine Institute of Architects PIA
Rogelio Villarosa (1997) - architect and recipient of the Gold Medal of Merit award from the Philippine Institute of Architects PIA; founder of R.Villarosa Architects; awarded BCI Asia Top Ten Architects in the Philippines; projects include The Gramercy Towers at Century City, Soho Central, and Hamilo Coast
Gabino DeLeon (1995), Edilberto Florentino (2002), Froilan Hong (1992), and Jaime Marquez (1997) - architects and recipients of the Outstanding Architect of the Year award from the Professional Regulation Commission PRC
Manuel Go - architect and builder of commercial landmarks
Felipe Mendoza - 1982 UAP first LIKHA and Gold Medal awardee; 1976 Patnubay ng Sining at Kalinangan awardee; recipient of the 1982 PRC Outstanding Architect of the Year award
Jose Mañosa - architect and builder, one of the famed Mañosa brothers
Armand Commandante, and Josefina Ramos - architects and educators
Willie Yu - architect and builder; co-founder of G&W Architects; awarded BCI Asia Top Ten Architects in the Philippines,
Aquiles Caesar Paredes - architect, legislator, educator; committee member to revise the National Building Code; co-founder of the Architecture Advocacy International Foundation; voted the 1991 Outstanding Architect of the Year by the PRC

Business and industry
Diosdado Banatao, BSEE - founder of S3 Graphics, Ltd.; considered the "Bill Gates of the Philippines" 
Antonio Abacan, Jr., BSBA - President of Metrobank
Arnel B. Aranas, BSMIE - President of American Standard Philippines
Oscar Biason, BSMIE - President and CEO of Bankard, Inc.
Ricardo Buencamino, BSEE - Executive Vice President of the Manila Electric Company (Meralco) and Director of Meralco Industrial Engineering Corp. (MIESCor)
Rudyardo Bunda, BSBA - Chief Operating Officer of the Union Bank of the Philippines
Nilo S. Cruz, BSMIE - President of Hewlett-Packard Philippines 
Felizardo dela Merced, BSEE/BSECE - President of Asian Media Development Group and AZ Communications
Amaury Gutierrez, BSME - former President of Caltex Philippines
Roberto Huang, BSME - President of Coca-Cola, Bottlers Phils.
Edilberto Palisoc, BSCE - General Manager of D.M. Consunji, Inc. (DMCI), one of the largest construction companies in the Philippines
Rodolfo Quiambao, BSCE - President and CEO of Rudell and Associates; cited as one of the 50 Outstanding Asian-Americans in Business in the USA
Eliseo Santiago, BSME - President of Pilipinas Royal Dutch Shell Petroleum Corporation
Alfonso Supetran, BSChE - founder of ACS Manufacturing Corporation
Jimmy T. Tang, BSEE - President of the AVESCO Group of Companies; member of the Metrobank Board of Trustees
Jacinto Tan Uy, BSChE - President and founder of the Moldex Realty Inc., property developers 
Oscar de Venecia, BSCE - Chief Executive Officer of Basic Consolidated
Augusto Villaluna, BSEM - Senior Vice President of Lepanto Mining Corp and Outstanding Mining Engineer of the Year awardee 
Manuel Villar, Jr., HS - businessman; founder of Camella & Palmera Homes, which built over a hundred thousand low- to medium-cost homes 
Angelito Villanueva, BSBA - BancNet Chairman of the Board
Alfredo Yao - founder of Zesto Corporation, manufacturer of Zest-O fruit drinks and other corporations, including the manufacturers of Beam toothpaste and Quickchow instant noodles
Manuel Bonoan, Juanito Ferrer and Romulo del Rosario - former National Presidents of the Philippine Institute of Civil Engineers (PICE)
Gregorio Sadora (1979), Luis Mendoza (1980), Salvador Dulog (1981), Calixto Duria (1982), Hilario Gaerlan (1984),  Meleusipo Fonorella (1988), Rafael Florentino (1989), Willington Tan (1990), Fernando Dumuk (1991), Benjamin Carbonell (1994), Gregorio Garces (1997) and Amador Calado (1998)  - former National Presidents of the Institute Integrated Electrical Engineers IIEE
Armando Pascual (1981), Julio Abarquez (1983), Arnaldo Baldonado (1984), Antonio Herrera (1986), Danilo Bulanadi (1990), Augusto Soliman (1994), Gerardo Hernandez (1996), Sergio Balolong (1998), Roberto Lozada (2002), and Danilo Hernandez (2004) - former National Presidents of the Philippine Society of Mechanical Engineers (PSME)
Angel Lazaro, Jr. - former National President of the United Architects of the Philippines (UAP)
Rosauro Calupitan, Conrado Hernandez, Severo Santiago, Fortunato Perlas, Rogelio Ramos, and Joel Marciano - former National Presidents of the Institute of Electronics and Communications Engineers of the Philippines 
Jose Saret - President of the Philippine Society of Mining Engineers
Bayani Fernando, BSME - founder of BF Corporation
Edward Ray T. Mago, BSCE (1985) - 2022 President, PICE-USA Chapter International Charter I-11 of the Philippine Institute of Civil Engineers (PICE)
Alfonso U. Lim, BSME - President of Limketkai Sons, Inc., Cagayan de Oro

Entertainment
 Renato "Compañero" Cayetano, HS - lawyer, former senator, and media personality
Ricky Davao, BSMIE - movie, television and stage actor; 1987 URIAN, Best Actor and 1989 FAMAS, Best Supporting Actor awardee
Joshua Dionisio, BSIE - GMA 7's teen star and known as Barbie Forteza's love team
Joseph Ejercito Estrada, HS - FAMAS Hall of Fame awardee; former Mayor, Senator and President of the Philippines
Augusto "Chiquito" Pangan, HS - popular comedian and 1984 FAMAS Best Actor awardee
Jerome Ponce - cast member of the hit Philippine daytime series Be Careful With My Heart
Ariel Ureta, HS - popular radio and television host, director, and comedian

Government and military service
Brig. Gen. Cesar Abella, BSCE - first Commander of the AFP Reserve Command (1991)
Raul Asis (BSCE)Undersecretaries of the Department of Public Works and Highways
Edmundo Mir (BSCE)Undersecretaries of the Department of Public Works and Highways
Romulo del Rosario (BSCE)Undersecretaries of the Department of Public Works and Highways
Florante Soriquez  (BSCE) - Undersecretaries of the Department of Public Works and Highways
Brig. Gen. Ramon Cannu, BSCE - former Commanding Officer of the AFP 2nd Infantry Division
Brig.Gen. Dominador Catibog Jr. (BSCE)former Chiefs of the AFP Corps of Engineers
Brig.Gen.  Cesar Gopilan  (BSCE)former Chiefs of the AFP Corps of Engineers
Brig.Gen.  Simeon Ver  (BSCE) - former Chiefs of the AFP Corps of Engineers
Belen Gobunsuy-Ceniza, BSChm - Commissioner of the Housing and Land Use Regulatory Board (HLURB)
Gen. Hermogenes E. Ebdane, Jr., BSCE - former PNP Chief and current Secretary of the Department of Public Works and Highways
Bayani Fernando, BSME - Former Chairman of the Metropolitan Manila Development Authority; former Secretary of the Department of Public Works and Highways; former Mayor of Marikina
Ruben A. Hernadez, BSCE - administrator of the  Manila Waterworks and Sewerage System (MWSS)
 Lt. Gen. Cardozo M. Luna, BSCE - Undersecretary of Department of National Defense; former Philippine Ambassador to the Netherlands; former Vice Chief of Staff and Lieutenant General of the Armed Forces of the Philippines
Ramon Allan Oca (BSMnE) - Undersecretary of the Department of Energy
Gen. Alfredo M. Santos, BSCE - former AFP Chief-of-Staff; became the Philippine's first four-star general in 1962
Jose Valdecanas, BSCE Undersecretaries of the Department of Transportation and Communications
Enrico Velasco, BSMIE - Undersecretaries of the Department of Transportation and Communications
Geronimo Velasco, BSME - former Secretary of the Department of Energy
Charles Merioles, BSECE - former Chief Information Officer (CIO), Duty Free Philippines Corporation (DFPC)

Politics
Jorge Abad, BSCE - former Congressman of Bataan
Agapito "Butz" Aquino, BSEE - former Senator and now Congressman of Makati; brother of Ninoy Aquino and Tessie Aquino-Oreta
Efren Arañez, BSCE - former Mayor of Zamboanga City
Jose Antonio Carrion, HS - Governor of Marinduque
Telesforo Castillejos, BSCE - Governor of Batanes
Edilburgo Cheng, BSME - Mayor of Dipolog
Pedro Cuerpo, BSCE - Mayor of Montalban, Rizal
Dennis Tanedo Go, BSCE - Mayor of Gerona, Tarlac
Romeo Dungca, BSIE - Former Mayor of Bacolor, Pampanga
Aurelio Gonzales Jr., BSCE - 3rd District Congressman of Pampanga
Edwin Santiago, BSME - Former Mayor of San Fernando, Pampanga
Bayani Fernando, BSME - Former Mayor of Marikina City and Former 1st District Congressman of Marikina City
Faustino Dy, Jr., BSAR - former Isabela 2nd District Congressman and former Governor of Isabela Province
Jimmy J. Fragata, BSGeo - Former Mayor of Juban, Sorsogon
Donato D. Marcos, BSEM - Mayor of Paombong, Bulacan
Carlito Marquez, BSChE - Governor of Aklan
Raul Mendoza, BSBA - Mayor of Calumpit, Bulacan
Frisco F. San Juan, BSCE - former Congressman of Rizal
Arturo Tolentino, HS - former Congressman, Senator, Senate President, and Vice-President of the Philippines
J. Antonio Lim Sr., HS - former Mayor of Jimenez, Misamis Occidental; founding President, Jimenez Rural Bank Inc.
Celso Valdecanas, BSCE - Mayor of Balanga, Bataan
Manuel Villar, Jr., HS - former Speaker of the House of Representatives of the Philippines; former Senate President.
Erwin Buling, BSEE - former Mayor of San Juan, Southern Leyte; formerly Cabalian, Leyte
Joseph Salvador Tan, BSCE - Mayor of Santiago City, Isabela
Haizer B. David, BSCE - Former PPSK President of San Simon, Pampanga

Science and technology
Arturo Alcaraz, BSMining - expert on geothermal energy; recipient of the Ramon Magsaysay Award (Asia's version of the Nobel Prize) in 1982; born in Manila
Diosdado Banatao, BSEE - his contributions to the computer industry include the first single-chip, 16-bit microprocessor-based calculator while at Commodore in 1976; the first single-chip MicroVAX for Digital Equipment; the first 10-Mbit Ethernet CMOS with silicon coupler data-link control and trans-receiver chip; got 3Com into the Ethernet PC add-in card business while at Seeq Technology in the early 1980s; the first system logic chip set for the PC-XT and the PC-AT in 1985; and the first enhanced graphics adapter chip set; he was honored by the University of the Philippines and Ateneo de Manila University with a Doctorate Honoris Causa; born in Iguig, Cagayan
Leon Chua, BSEE - former Department Chair, University of California, Berkeley, Electrical Engineering; first recipient of the 2005 Gustav Kirchhoff Award, the highest IEEE Technical Field Award, for outstanding contributions to the fundamentals of any aspect of electronic circuits and systems; recipient of the IEEE Neural Networks Pioneer Award in 2000, the IEEE Browder J. Thompson Memorial Prize in 1972, the IEEE W. R. G. Baker Prize in 1978, the Frederick Emmons Award in 1974, and the M. E. Van Valkenhurg Award in 1995 and 1998; holder of 7 US patents and 8 honorary doctorates; recognized by the Institute for Scientific Information as one of the top 15 most-cited authors in all fields of engineering from 1991-2001
Severino Gervacio, BSME - recipient of the 1981 Outstanding Young Scientist Award given by the National Academy of Science and Technology (NAST), and the Lifetime Achievement Award in the Division of Mathematical Sciences given by the National Research Council of the Philippines in recognition of his outstanding achievements in pioneering research in graph theory
Blandino Go, BSMetE - metallurgist in the aerospace industry; pioneering work on rapidly solidified dispersion strengthened aluminum alloys for high-temperature creep deformation resistance His other research on superplasticity allowed the rapid deployment of super-plastic forming of aluminum and titanium into production in the aerospace industry earlier than expected.
Antonio Mateo, BSEE - multi-awarded inventor with over 50 patents under his name; acknowledged and cited by the Geneva-based World Intellectual Property Organization; winner in the 27th International Exhibit of Inventions in Switzerland
Salvador Umotoy, BSEE - Engineering Director at Applied Materials Inc. Sta. Clara, California, USA and holder of 32 US patents in silicon wafer production and research

Sports
Emilio Achacoso - member of the 1960 Olympic team for basketball
Carlos Badion - member of the 1956 and 1960 Olympic teams; MVP of the 1960 Asian Basketball Confederation Championship; Philippine Basketball Hall of Fame awardee
Joel Banal, BSMIE - former basketball coach of the Mapua Cardinals-NCAA champion teams of 1991 and 1992, and Ateneo Blue Eagles, the UAAP champion team of 2002
Edilberto Bonus - former President of the Philippine Amateur Swimming Association; former MIT math professor and coach of the Mapua Swimming team, which holds the NCAA record for most number of seniors championships; 1951 Asian Games bronze medalist
Fortunato "Atoy" Co, BSChE - Philippine Basketball Association PBA's 1979 MVP awardee; member of the 1972 Olympic team, the 1973 Asian Basketball Conference champion team, the legendary Crispa Redmanizers, the PBA's Hall of Fame and 25 All-Time Greatest Players; present Head Coach of the Mapua Cardinals Basketball team
Henry Dagmil - member of the 2008 Philippine Olympic team for track and field; 2005 South East Asian Games gold medalist and record holder in the long jump event
Freddie Hubalde, Philippine Basketball Association's 1977 Most Valuable Player awardee; member of the legendary Crispa Redmanizers; one of the PBA's 25 All-Time Greatest Players
Leandro "Leo" Isaac, BSMIE - former Philippine Basketball Association player; captain of the 1980 Mapua Cardinals NCAA Championship team; former coach of the Arellano University Chiefs and the Mapua Cardinals senior basketball teams; current head coach of Red Bull Barako in the PBA
Perfecto Mendiola - former President of the Philippine Amateur Judo Association; 1956 National Judo champion; member of the 1955 Philippine team to the 1st World Judo Championships
Renato Naranja - member of the 1972 Olympic team for chess
Alvin "The Captain" Patrimonio, BSCE - four-time MVP awardee of the Philippine Basketball Association PBA  (1991, 1993, 1994 and 1997); member of several Philippine national basketball teams; one of the PBA's 25 All-Time Greatest Players
Simeon Toribio - member of the 1928, 1932 and 1936 Olympic teams; Olympic bronze medalist in the high jump event at the 1932 Los Angeles Olympics; many-time Asian Games gold medalist; recipient of the 1930 World Helms Trophy for being Asia's greatest athlete
Emmanuel "Sonny" Sugatan, BSCE - 18 times representative of the Philippines in Bowling from 1976 to 1985; 7th in Bowling World Cup 1977 in Tolworth, England; SEA games gold medalist; 1978 Asian games bronze medalist in Bangkok, Thailand.
Eugene Torre, BSBA - Asia's first chess Grand Master; Philippine Sports Hall of Fame awardee; member of the 1972 Olympic team for chess
Miguel White - member of the 1936 Olympic team; Olympic bronze medalist in the 400m hurdles at the 1936 Berlin Olympics
Israel Catacutan, Benito "Benny" Cheng, Virgilio "Bong" Dela Cruz, Paolo Hubalde, Menardo Jubinal, Rudolph Kutch, Eric Leaño, Romulo Mamaril, Jose Ma. “Jay” Mendoza, Kevin Ramas, Ricardo "Bruise Brother" Relosa, Johnny Revilla, Reuben Dela Rosa, Omanzie Rodriguez, Victor Sanchez, Gerardo "Jack" Santiago, Rodolfo "Rudy" Soriano, Mark Telan, Japeth Aguilar, Edgardo Topacio, Ejercito "Chito" Victolero - other former Mapua Cardinals who eventually played in the Philippine Basketball Association PBA

Others
Norma Riezza-Benzon - Executive Director of a Filipino Disaster Relief Task Force; one of the first community volunteers who responded to the pleas of evacuees by delivering food to affected areas in the wake of Hurricane Katrina in the US in 2006; Dorothy F. Caram Commitment to Leadership Awardee and Gawad Geny Lopez Bayaning Pilipino Awardee 
Scout Paulo Cabrera Madriñan - Scoutmaster and member of the Philippine delegation to the fateful 11th World Boy Scout Jamboree of 1963; a street in Roxas District of Quezon City was named in his honor.
Archimedes Trajano - human rights victim and martyr of the Martial Law dictatorship
Sister Ma. Aida Vasquez, OSB, BSChE - environmental activist

References

Mapua Institute of Technology
Mapua_Institute_of_Technology